Ty Harris (born November 13, 1991) is an American professional basketball player who currently plays for TFT of the Macedonian First League (basketball).

Early life
Harris was born in Houma, Louisiana but his family was displaced by Hurricane Katrina. They eventually settled in West Carrollton, Ohio, a suburb of Dayton. He graduated from West Carrollton High School.

Professional career
Not being drafted by any NBA team and being unknown in Europe, Harris signed for the 2015–16 season with the club KK Best in Macedonia.

References

External links
 at basketball.eurobasket.com
 at highlandcountypress.com
Columbus State bio

1991 births
Living people
American expatriate basketball people in Bosnia and Herzegovina
American expatriate basketball people in Morocco
American expatriate basketball people in North Macedonia
American men's basketball players
Basketball players from New Orleans
Columbus State Cougars men's basketball players
Junior college men's basketball players in the United States
People from Montgomery County, Ohio
Point guards
Sportspeople from Houma, Louisiana